Chloromyia formosa is a species of soldier flies belonging to the family Stratiomyidae. Another name for it is Broad centurion.

Distribution
This species is present in most of Europe (Austria, Belgium, Bulgaria, Czech Republic, Denmark, Finland, France, Germany, Greece, Ireland, Italy, Luxembourg, Netherlands, Norway, Poland, Russia, Spain, Sweden, Switzerland, United Kingdom), in the Near East, in the Nearctic realm, and in North Africa.

Habitat
These flies mainly inhabit wooded areas, hedge rows, moist forests, wet meadows, parks and gardens.

Description
Their body is elongated, the thorax is metallic green, the head is hemispherical without hair, while the eyes are quite hairy. Antennae are short, the first antennal segment is longer than the second. The legs are black, only the knees are yellow. The abdomen is flattened and broad.

An evident dimorphism exists between the males and the females of this species. In females the abdomen is blue-green with a purple sheen (depending on the light), while in males it shows a copper-green sheen. The female’s eyes are separated from each other. The wings are yellowish-brown.

Biology
Adults can mostly be encountered from April through August, feeding on nectar of flowers (mainly of Apiaceae species) and on pollen of Filipendula ulmaria (Rosaceae).  Between April and August these insects mate several times. The larvae develop in humus-rich soil, feeding on dead leaves and other decaying vegetal substances. After reaching the final stage larvae overwinter.

Bibliography
 Gibson, R. H., Nelson, I. L., Hopkins G. W., Hamlett, B. J., Memmott J. (2006). Pollinator webs, plant communities and the conservation of rare plants: arable weeds as a case study. Journal of Applied Ecology 43: 246—257
 Mason, F., Rozkošný, R., Hauser, M. (2009). A review of the soldier flies (Diptera: Stratiomyidae) of Sardinia. Zootaxa 2318: 507–530
 Nartshuk, E. P. (2009). The character of soldier fly distribution (Diptera, Stratiomyidae) in Eastern Europe. Entomological review 89(1): 46-55. DOI:10.1134/S0013873809010072
 Rozkošný, R. 1998. Chapter 24. Family Stratiomyidae. Manual Palaearct. Dipt. 2: 387-411.

References

External links
 Aramel.free
 Insectoid
 Nature Spot
 Insektenbox

Stratiomyidae
Diptera of Europe
Diptera of Africa
Diptera of North America
Insects described in 1763
Taxa named by Giovanni Antonio Scopoli